Up Close and Personal Tour may refer to:

Up Close and Personal Tour, a tour by Guns N' Roses
Up Close & Personal Tour, a tour by Backstreet Boys
Number Ones, Up Close and Personal, a tour by Janet Jackson